SAUP may refer to:

Sea Around Us Project, an international research group based at the University of British Columbia UBC Fisheries Centre devoted to studying the impacts of fisheries on the world's marine ecosystems
San Antonio Unido Portuario, a football club located in the port city of San Antonio, Chile
Société des Amis des Universités de Paris (English: the Society of Friends of the Universities of Paris)